Bryantsville may refer to:

Bryantsville, Indiana
Bryantsville, Kentucky